Megaloblatta longipennis is a species of cockroach in the family Ectobiidae. It is one of the largest extant cockroaches by length and wingspan.

Description

References 

Insects described in 1868
Cockroaches